Scaevola verticillata is a species of plant in the family Goodeniaceae. It is endemic to Borneo where it is confined to Sarawak.

References

verticillata
Endemic flora of Borneo
Flora of Sarawak
Vulnerable plants
Taxonomy articles created by Polbot